Bocabec is a community in Saint Patrick Parish, Charlotte County in the Canadian province of New Brunswick. It is located between Digdeguash and Chamcook.

History

Notable people

See also
List of communities in New Brunswick

References

Communities in Charlotte County, New Brunswick